William E. Leonard (1836–February 8, 1891)  was a Private in the Union Army and a Medal of Honor recipient for his actions in the American Civil War.

He is buried at Jacksonville Cemetery Wind Ridge, Pennsylvania.

Medal of Honor citation
Rank and organization: Private, Company F, 85th Pennsylvania Infantry. Place and date: At Deep Bottom, Va., April 16, 1864. Entered service at: Jacksonville, Pa. Birth: Greene County, Pa. Date of issue: April 6, 1865.

Citation:

Capture of battle flag.

See also

 List of Medal of Honor recipients
 List of American Civil War Medal of Honor recipients: G–L

References

External links
 

1836 births
1891 deaths
United States Army Medal of Honor recipients
United States Army soldiers
People from Greene County, Pennsylvania
People of Pennsylvania in the American Civil War
American Civil War recipients of the Medal of Honor